Ernest Gevers (28 August 1891 – 1965) was a Belgian fencer. He won two silver medals in the team épée competitions at the 1920 and the 1924 Summer Olympics.

References

1891 births
1965 deaths
Belgian male fencers
Belgian épée fencers
Olympic fencers of Belgium
Fencers at the 1920 Summer Olympics
Fencers at the 1924 Summer Olympics
Olympic silver medalists for Belgium
Olympic medalists in fencing
Sportspeople from Antwerp
Medalists at the 1920 Summer Olympics
Medalists at the 1924 Summer Olympics
20th-century Belgian people